Peroxynitric acid or peroxonitric acid is a chemical compound with the formula . It is an oxyacid of nitrogen, after peroxynitrous acid.

Preparation

Peroxynitrate, the conjugate base of peroxynitric acid, is formed rapidly during decomposition of peroxynitrite in neutral conditions.

Atmospheric chemistry 
Peroxynitric acid is formed in the atmosphere, although it is unstable, it is important as a reservoir for NO2 through the reversible radical reaction:
   +

References

Nitrogen oxoacids
Peroxy acids
Nitrogen(V) compounds